The Mondo Enduro round the world motorbike expedition attempted but did not cross the Zilov Gap in Central Siberia. In 2000 a follow-up expedition, Terra Circa, was organised by Dave Greenhough, brother of one of the Mondo Enduro team members. It was the first motorbike expedition to cross the infamous Zilov Gap.

The route went from London across Europe, western Russia and Siberia to Vladivostok. Terra Circa's original Eurasian destination was Magadan, but injuries and logistical difficulties forced them to reroute towards Vladivostok.  The team then embarked for Japan and returned to Europe crossing the United States. It took 7 months and they drove 20 000 miles.

The members were: Dave Greenhough (organizer), Austin Vince, Charlie Benner, Gerald Vince, Joe MacManus (until Turkey), and Matt Hill (until Turkey and then from Russia). Dave Greenhough had to leave early because of a knee injury, and Matt Hill jumped in again (he had left the expedition in Turkey with Joe MacManus) to finish with the others.

Like its predecessor, Terra Circa is a shoestring expedition with rough camping the order of the day and has a cult following amongst adventure motorcyclists.

The expedition was filmed and made into a six-part TV series, shown on British cable channel Men & Motors.

Episodes

Note that this list is not complete, as the episodes are scarce on the city names the expedition drove through.

Music
Like Mondo Enduro also Terra Circa has its own musical themes in every episode. Some of the music is performed and composed by Austin Vince and his band. Other musical inserts are from the Black Moses: "Slow Mama", "Strange Life" and The Greenhornes: "Good Time", "Stay Away Girl". Abandoned viewpoint in Japan has Syd Dales "Walrus And The Carpenter" playing as a musical theme.

References
 Terra Circa (DVD), Aimimage Productions. ASIN: B000KN9Q3Y.
 Times Educational Supplement Magazine, 23 March 2007, pp 8–10.

External links
 MondoEnduro.com — official website. 
 AustinVince.com — Austin Vince's personal page
 Upright Music Vibey 60's selection — Austin Vince's music from the Vibey 60's selection.

Motorcycle television series
Long-distance motorcycle riding